William Richard Chetwynd, 3rd Viscount Chetwynd (1684 – 3 April 1770) was a British politician who sat in the House of Commons from 1715 to 1770.

Early life
Chetwynd was the youngest son of John Chetwynd (1643–1702) and thus younger brother of Walter Chetwynd, 1st Viscount Chetwynd and John Chetwynd, 2nd Viscount Chetwynd.  He was educated at Westminster School (c.1698–1702) and Christ Church, Oxford. In 1706, he became secretary to his elder brother John on his appointment as British envoy to Savoy at Turin, and in 1708 became British Resident at Genoa. During the financial crisis precipitated by the War of the Spanish Succession, the Chetwynd brothers drew on their commercial credit to provide General James Stanhope with the funds he needed to pay the British troops in Spain. William was recalled to England in 1712. He married Honora Baker, the daughter of William Baker, consul at Algiers in 1715.

Political career

Chetwynd was returned unopposed with his brother Walter as Member of Parliament for Stafford at the 1715 general election and was appointed to office as a junior Lord of the Admiralty in 1717. Both brothers were defeated in a contest at Stafford in 1722 but he also stood for Parliament on the Navy interest at Plymouth and was returned there in 1722. Having voted with his friend Viscount Bolingbroke he lost his post at the Admiralty in 1727 and was not put forward for Plymouth again at the 1727 general election. He was elected MP for Stafford in 1734 in place of his brother Walter and was returned unopposed in 1741. In 1743 he was slightly injured in a duel at Parliament with Horatio Walpole. He was appointed master of the mint in 1744 and held the post until 1769. In 1745 he was appointed under-secretary of state and held the post until 1748. He was returned for Stafford again at the 1747 general election. He was returned for Stafford at the general elections of 1754, 1761 and after succeeding to his brother's Irish peerage under a special remainder in 1767 at the 1768 general election.

Death and legacy
Chetwynd died on 3 April 1770 aged 86. He had two sons and four daughters, but disinherited his surviving son, William, who became the 4th Viscount.

Chetwynd built and lived in Chetwynd House in Stafford, now Stafford Post Office.

References

H. M. Stephens, 'Chetwynd, William Richard, third Viscount Chetwynd (1685?–1770)’, rev. Philip Carter, Oxford Dictionary of National Biography, (Oxford University Press, 2004) , accessed 15 Nov 2008.
Burkes' Peerage (1939 edition).

1684 births
1770 deaths
People educated at Westminster School, London
Alumni of Christ Church, Oxford
British diplomats
Lords of the Admiralty
Masters of the Mint
Viscounts in the Peerage of Ireland
Members of the Parliament of Great Britain for Stafford
British MPs 1715–1722
British MPs 1722–1727
British MPs 1734–1741
British MPs 1741–1747
British MPs 1747–1754
British MPs 1754–1761
British MPs 1761–1768
British MPs 1768–1774